Euryphalara is a genus of tephritid  or fruit flies in the family Tephritidae.

Species
Euryphalara barnardi (Bezzi, 1924)
Euryphalara mecistocephala (Munro, 1929)

References

Tephritinae
Tephritidae genera
Diptera of Africa